Raymond Louis Specht  (19 July 1924 – 13 February 2021) was an Australian plant ecologist, conservationist and academic, who participated in the Arnhem Land Scientific Expedition of 1948.

Early life

Raymond Louis Specht was born in 1924 in Adelaide, South Australia to Louis and Harriet Specht. He attended Richmond Primary School and Adelaide High School, finishing high school as dux in 1941. Specht intended to pursue teaching as a career. In 1942 he was a student teacher in physics, chemistry and mathematics at Riverton High School.

After attending a short course in teaching at the University of Adelaide, he enrolled in Adelaide Teachers College studying biology in 1943. He combined this with studies at the University of Adelaide, and ultimately took his BSc in botany and zoology in 1945 before taking first class honours in plant ecology in 1946.

Arnhem Land Scientific Expedition 
Specht was invited to join the National Geographic Society and Smithsonian Institution sponsored Arnhem Land Scientific Expedition in 1946. After completing his Honours project he and the 15 other members of the group set out from Adelaide in March 1948. As the botanist for the group, Specht would spend 8 months with the team, collecting 25 tonnes of specimens. After the expedition ended, Specht and his specimens flew to Brisbane in 1949 where the collected materials were identified and prepared for distribution around the world. Materials were sent to six herbaria within Australia, to Kew in England, the Rijksmuseum in Leiden, the Smithsonian Institution and Arnold Arboretum in the U.S.

Specht returned to Adelaide and worked steadily on recording the materials recovered from the expedition over the next 14 years. The results of this would become Volume 3 of the Expedition, Botany and plant ecology (1958), co-edited with Charles P. Mountford. He also edited Volume 4 entitled Zoology (1964).

Specht worked as a senior research fellow at the University of Adelaide from 1950 while he worked on his MSc. He was appointed a lecturer in botany in 1951, and worked on his PhD for the next two years, on mineral nutrition and biomass relationships of the heath vegetation at Dark Island, South Australia. He rose to Senior Lecturer in 1955. In 1956, Specht earned Fulbright, Smith Mundt and Carnegie grants to study in the U.S.

Specht took up a position as Reader in plant ecology at the University of Melbourne in 1961, and became Acting Head of the Department of Botany in 1964. He moved to the University of Queensland in 1966 as Professor and Head of the Department of Botany and remained there until 1989. He was Visiting Professor in the Department of Forestry at the University of Oxford in 1970. He was Visiting Professor in the Department of Botany at the University of Leeds in 1975.

Specht was made an Officer of the Order of Australia in 2020 for "distinguished service to science, and to education, in the fields of botany, plant ecology and conservation."

Personal life 
Specht married Marion Gillies in 1952. They met on a University of Queensland Science Student Expedition to Fraser Island in 1949. They had one daughter, Alison. Specht died on 13 February 2021.

Published works 
 Vegetation of South Australia (1972)
 Conservation Survey of Australia (1974, 1995)
 Heathlands of the World (1979, 1981)
 Mediterranean Ecosystems of the World (1981, 1988)
 Ecological Biogeography of Australia. Volume 1 (1981)
 Co-authored with daughter, Alison Specht, Australian Plant Communities: Dynamics of structure, growth & biodiversity (1999, second edition 2002).

References 

1924 births
2021 deaths
20th-century Australian scientists
Australian writers
Australian people of German descent
Scientists from Adelaide
Academic staff of the University of Queensland
Officers of the Order of Australia
University of Adelaide alumni
People educated at Adelaide High School
Australian conservationists